Three/Three is the third studio album by American musician Tadd Mullinix, under the name Dabrye. It was released on February 16, 2018 by Ghostly International.

Critical reception
Three/Three was met with "generally favorable" reviews from critics. At Metacritic, which assigns a weighted average rating out of 100 to reviews from mainstream publications, this release received an average score of 80 based on 8 reviews. Aggregator Album of the Year gave the release a 74 out of 100 based on a critical consensus of 6 reviews.

Track listing

References

2018 albums
Dabrye albums
Ghostly International albums